Stavros Georgiou (born September 14, 1972) is a football manager and former international footballer. He is the current manager of Ethnikos Assias team.

He had a great career while playing for APOEL from 2002 to 2007, in which he won three Championships (2002, 2004, 2007), one Cup (2006) and one Super Cup (2004).

International career 
On 11 October 2003, Georgiou made his debut with the national team of Cyprus in the home draw 2–2 against Slovenia for UEFA Euro 2004 qualifyiers in which he scored his only goal.

International goals
Scores and results list Cyprus's goal tally first

Managerial career 
Stavros Georgiou started his managerial career in 2012 at PAEEK FC as assistant manager and the following year became the head coach of the club. In 2014, he appointed as manager of APOEL's U-19 team which competed in the 2014–15 UEFA Youth League.

Honours
APOEL
 Cypriot First Division (3) : 2001–02, 2003–04, 2006–07
 Cypriot Cup (1) : 2005–06
 Cypriot Super Cup (1) : 2004

References

External links
 

1972 births
Living people
Cypriot footballers
Cyprus international footballers
Greek Cypriot people
Association football midfielders
People from Famagusta
Apollon Limassol FC players
Ethnikos Achna FC players
APOEL FC players
PAEEK players
Cypriot First Division players
Cypriot football managers